The men's long jump event at the 1990 Commonwealth Games was held on 1 February at the Mount Smart Stadium in Auckland.

Medalists

Results

Qualification

Final

References

Qualification results

Long
1990